Lambros Lambrou (Λάμπρος Λάμπρου, born 10 April 1957) is a retired alpine skier from Cyprus. He competed in the slalom and giant slalom at the 1984 Winter Olympics and finished in 41st and 70th place, respectively.

References

1957 births
Living people
Cypriot male alpine skiers
Olympic alpine skiers of Cyprus
Alpine skiers at the 1984 Winter Olympics